The Progressive Action Party (PAP) was a Cuban political party led by Fulgencio Batista. The party was founded on 1 April 1949, in the aftermath of the 1948 general elections, under the name of Unitary Action Party (PAU). It presented its first manifesto a few months later, on 1 August. In 1952, certain to lose the election, Batista made a coup d'etat by seizing the Presidency.

The party also ran in the elections of 1954 and 1958, winning due to the early withdrawal of opponents, as well as electoral fraud.

The party was based on a combination of strong conservatism and economic liberalism on a large scale, to attract American capital in Cuba. This led to a high level of corruption and poverty plaguing the country. Other bulwark of the party was anti-communism, not only because of the alignment with the United States but also because most of the members of the anti-Batista left-wing nationalist 26th of July Movement could be branded as Communists, including Fidel Castro and Camilo Cienfuegos, along with genuine communists like Raul Castro and Che Guevara. Batista's authoritarian rule and repression in response to Castro's movement led to the deaths of 20,000 Cubans through torture and extrajudicial killing.

The party was dissolved following the Cuban Revolution of 1959, which ousted Batista causing it to flee abroad and led to the establishment of the revolutionary government of Fidel Castro, which officially became a communist regime in 1961.

Electoral history

Presidential elections

Note 
Andrés Rivero Agüero was unable to take office due to the Cuban Revolution

House of Representatives elections

Senate elections

External links

Defunct political parties in Cuba
1950s in Cuba
Political parties established in 1949
Political parties disestablished in 1959
1949 establishments in Cuba
1959 disestablishments in Cuba